The Ebell Society was a woman's club with its first chapter in Oakland, California. It was founded in 1876 and was originally called the International Academy for the Advancement of Women. The club's purpose was the advancement of women in cultural, industrial and intellectual pursuits. 

After feminist Adrian John Ebell's early death in 1877 at age 37 the International Academy for the Advancement of Women renamed their club to honor him. Other chapters formed in California.

From 1907 to 1959 the Oakland chapter had a club house built in the Tudor Revival style located at 1440 Harrison Street. That building was destroyed by fire in 1959.

The original Oakland chapter disbanded in 2011.

Gallery

See also
 Ebell Club of Santa Paula, California
 Ebell of Los Angeles, California
Ebell of Long Beach, California

References

Women's clubs in the United States
Women's organizations based in the United States